Nemanja Glavčić (born 19 February 1997) is a Serbian professional football player who plays as a midfielder for Russian Premier League side Khimki.

Club career

Partizan
Originating from Bogutovac, Glavčić was born in Kraljevo, Glavčić started training football at the age of 5 with local football school "Bambi". He played for youth categories of Sloga Kraljevo until 2011, when he joined Partizan. He was loaned to Teleoptik for a season 2014–15 season. Glavčić signed his first professional five-year contract with Partizan on 18 June 2015. He made his Serbian SuperLiga debut in 3rd fixture of 2015–16 Serbian SuperLiga, against Novi Pazar. During the winter break off-season, Glavčić returned to Teleoptik, where he spent the rest of 2015–16 season. In summer 2016, Glavčić terminated the contract with club.

Spartak Subotica
Glavčić moved to Spartak Subotica in summer 2016 and signed a three-year professional contract with the club. He started the 2016–17 Serbian SuperLiga season as the back-up option, having split playing time with Nnaemeka Ajuru for the first half-season. During the second half-season, Glavčić played mostly matches, pairing with Marko Pantić on two defensive midfield positions. During the season, Glavčić made 33 matches in both domestic competitions at total, under coach Andrey Chernyshov. Glavčić scored his first goal for Spartak Subotica in 3–2 victory over Mačva Šabac on 14 August 2017. He also scored in the Serbian Cup match against Polet Lipljan on 20 September same year.

Slaven Belupo
On 9 July 2019, Glavčić signed for Prva HNL club Slaven Belupo. He scored his first goal on 30 October 2019 in a Croatian Cup match against BSK Bijelo Brdo, which Slaven won 2–0. Upon arrival of new coach Tomislav Stipić, Glavčić soon turned into one of the key parts of the Slaven squad. He scored his first Prva HNL goal on 22 August 2020 in a 2–1 defeat to Gorica. On 16 October, he scored once and assisted Tomislav Božić twice in a 5–1 routing of Istra 1961. He also notably assisted Stipe Bačelić-Grgić in a 2–2 draw with Hajduk Split and Törles Knöll in a 3–3 draw with Dinamo Zagreb on 29 August and 19 September, respectively. His great performances in Croatia sparked debates in Serbia about whether Partizan gave up on the player too early.

Khimki
On 18 January 2022, he signed a 2.5-year contract with Russian club Khimki.

International career
Glavčić has been called into the Serbian national team selections since 2012. As a youth player, he represented the country passing all selections from under-16 to under-19 level. In November 2016, he was also called into the Serbia national under-20 football team under coach Nenad Lalatović for a friendly match against Montenegro, after which he appeared as a regular team member until 2017.

Career statistics

Club

Honours
 Partizan
Serbian Cup: 2015–16

References

External links
 Nemanja Glavčić stats at utakmica.rs
 
 
 
 

1997 births
Living people
Sportspeople from Kraljevo
Association football midfielders
Serbian footballers
Serbia youth international footballers
FK Partizan players
FK Teleoptik players
FK Spartak Subotica players
NK Slaven Belupo players
FC Khimki players
Serbian SuperLiga players
Croatian Football League players
Russian Premier League players
Serbian expatriate footballers
Expatriate footballers in Croatia
Serbian expatriate sportspeople in Croatia
Expatriate footballers in Russia
Serbian expatriate sportspeople in Russia